Lamjed Maafi (born 19 March 2001) is a Tunisian wrestler. He competed in the 2020 Summer Olympics after winning the African and Oceanian qualifier. He competed in the 77 kg event.

References

External links

2001 births
Living people
People from Aryanah
Wrestlers at the 2020 Summer Olympics
Tunisian male sport wrestlers
Olympic wrestlers of Tunisia
African Games competitors for Tunisia
Competitors at the 2019 African Games
Wrestlers at the 2018 Summer Youth Olympics
Competitors at the 2022 Mediterranean Games
21st-century Tunisian people